The 2019 San Marino and Rimini Riviera motorcycle Grand Prix was the thirteenth round of the 2019 MotoGP season. It was held at the Misano World Circuit Marco Simoncelli in Misano Adriatico on 15 September 2019.

Classification

MotoGP

 Andrea Iannone withdrew from the event due to a shoulder injury.

Moto2

 Marcel Schrötter (broken clavicle) and Mattia Pasini (thoracic vertebrae) withdrew from the event due to injuries sustained in crashes during practice.

Moto3
Can Öncü was replaced by Deniz Öncü after the first practice session due to injury.

 Romano Fenati suffered a broken wrist in a crash during practice and withdrew from the event.

MotoE

Race 1

All bikes manufactured by Energica.

Race 2

 Niki Tuuli suffered wrist and femur fractures in a crash during Race 1.
All bikes manufactured by Energica.

Championship standings after the race

MotoGP

Moto2

Moto3

MotoE

Notes

References

External links

San Marino
San Marino and Rimini Riviera motorcycle Grand Prix
San Marino and Rimini Riviera motorcycle Grand Prix
San Marino and Rimini Riviera motorcycle Grand Prix